Jone Macilai, also known by the nickname of "Johnny", is a Fijian rugby league footballer who is notable for playing for the Fiji Bati in the 2008 Rugby League World Cup and the 2009 Pacific Cup. He now plays for the Ormeau Shearers after previously playing for Kyogle Turkeys A-Grade team, Fassifern RLFC, Murwillumbah Mustangs and the Coral Coast Cowboys.

References

1983 births
Living people
Fiji national rugby league team players
Fijian rugby league players
Kyogle Turkeys players
Rugby league centres
I-Taukei Fijian people